Mike Sigrist is an American Magic: The Gathering player. Most of his significant finishes to date came in the 2014–15 season, in which he also won the Player of the Year title.

Achievements 

Other accomplishments
 Player of the Year 2014–15

References

Living people
American Magic: The Gathering players
People from Foxborough, Massachusetts
Year of birth missing (living people)